Mian Atur Khan Kalhoro (Urdu) ميان عطرخان کلھوڑو) was a king of the Kalhora Dynasty that ruled Sindh from 1701 to 1783.

History of Sindh
Kalhora dynasty
18th-century monarchs in Asia
Sindhi people
Year of birth missing
Year of death missing